Sun Xiaobin (born 16 February 1999) is a Chinese footballer currently playing as a central defender for Zibo Cuju.

Career statistics

Club
.

References

1999 births
Living people
Chinese footballers
Association football defenders
China League One players
Shandong Taishan F.C. players
Shenzhen F.C. players
Zibo Cuju F.C. players